Toorak House is a mansion located in Melbourne, Australia built in 1849 by well-known Melbourne merchant James Jackson.  It is notable for its use as Melbourne's first Government House and having inspired the name for the suburb of Toorak.

Jackson is believed to have borrowed from Woiwurrung language, with words of similar pronunciation, meaning either black crow or reedy swamp.

Toorak House is owned by the Church of Sweden abroad. The Swedish Church and Cafe and Shop is open for visitors daily except on Mondays and Wednesdays.

History
Toorak House was built in 1849 by well-known Melbourne merchant James Jackson and designed by Samuel Jackson in the Italianate Victorian architecture style.

When Jackson died in 1851 it was leased to the Victorian government in 1854 for use by the first Governor of Victoria, Captain Sir Charles Hotham KCB RN and four of his successors until 1874—Sir Henry Barkly GCMG KCB, Sir Charles Darling KCB, John Manners-Sutton, 3rd Viscount Canterbury and Sir George Bowen PC GCMG. The property comprised 47 hectares bounded by Orrong, Kooyong and Toorak Roads, and the Yarra River. 
In 1874 lease negotiations to enable the Governor to continue to reside at Toorak House while the new Government House was completed broke down. Another temporary residence needed to be found for Governor Bowen.Bishopscourt in East Melbourne was then used before the present Government House was finished and occupied in 1876.

It reverted to being a private home in 1876, and was used as a Women's Auxiliary Australian Air Force hostel during World War II. In 1956 it was purchased by the Church of Sweden, which converted the property into a church and community centre.

Exterior shots of the property and grounds have featured in several Australian drama serials. Toorak House was used as the location for Godfrey Carson House in the period drama Carson’s Law, and as the South Yarra/Toorak mansion inherited by Patricia Hamilton in Sons and Daughters.

References

Melbourne
Victorian architecture in Victoria (Australia)
Official residences in Australia
Houses in Melbourne
Residential buildings completed in 1849
1849 establishments in Australia
Buildings and structures in the City of Stonnington